Miss Universe Slovenskej Republiky or Miss Slovak Republic is an annual beauty pageant held in Slovak Republic to select the country's representative to the Miss Universe pageant since 1994 and Miss Earth since 2005.

History
A Slovak Republic representative will be selected for Miss Slovensko for the debut after Silvia Lakatošová represented the country at the Miss Universe pageant. The Miss Slovensko contest was formed in 1993 after the dissolution of Czechoslovakia. From 1993 to 1995, the winner went to Miss Universe and the runners-up went to Miss World and Miss International.

Miss Universe Slovenskej Republiky is organized and produced by Silvia Lakatošová, the last Miss Czechoslovakia titleholder and first Slovak representative in the history of the Miss Universe pageant, where she placed fifth as one of the Top 6 finalists. Lakatošová acquired the Miss Universe franchise in 1999 and started the first ever Miss Universe Slovenskej Republiky pageant.

Miss Universe Slovenskej Republiky titleholders will represent their country at the Miss Universe, Miss Earth and Miss Intercontinental pageant until 2016. Since 2017 the organization is only taking the Miss Universe franchise.

In 2019 there was new format which called "Miss Česko-Slovensko" competition. this format collaborated to Czech Miss who also took the main winner to Miss Universe. The candidates traveled to Greece to have new experiences as Beauty Queen.

International winners
 One – Miss Intercontinental winner: Katarína Manová (2006)

Titleholders

Titleholders under Miss Slovenskej Republiky

Miss Universe Slovakia

Miss Universe Slovakia has started to send a winner to Miss Universe from 1994. On occasion, when the winner does not qualify (due to age) for either contest, a runner-up is sent.

Miss Earth Slovakia

Miss Universe Slovakia has started to send a runner-up to Miss Earth from 2005.

See also
Muž Roku Slovenskej Republiky

References

External links
 Official Miss Universe Slovenskej Republiky website

Slovak Republic
Beauty pageants in Slovakia
Recurring events established in 1999
1999 establishments in Slovakia
Slovak awards